Little China is a term referring to a politico-cultural ideology and phenomenon in which various Japanese, Korean and Vietnamese regimes identified themselves as "China" and regarded themselves to be legitimate successors to the Chinese civilization. Informed by the traditional Chinese concepts of Sinocentrism and Hua–Yi distinction, this belief became more apparent after the Manchu-led Qing dynasty had superseded the Han-led Ming dynasty in China proper, as Tokugawa Japan, Joseon Korea and Nguyễn Vietnam, among others, perceived that "barbarians" had ruined the center of world civilization.

Little China ideology in the Sinosphere 

Since ancient times, the realm of "China" has not been a fixed or predetermined concept based on ethnicity or geographical location. According to the Spring and Autumn Annals, "Chinese" people who adopt the ways of the "barbarians" would be considered "barbarians", whereas "barbarians" who adopt the ways of the "Chinese" would be accepted as "Chinese". Hence, the idea of "Chinese-ness" is a fluid concept and is defined through self-identification and cultural affiliation.

Having been heavily influenced by Chinese culture and political thoughts, numerous Korean, Vietnamese and Japanese regimes identified themselves with names that are traditionally associated with and used by China. At the same time, these regimes considered themselves as legitimate successors to Chinese culture and civilization.

Korea 
According to the History of the Three Kingdoms, Silla adopted the clothing and customs of the Tang dynasty as a way of transforming its people from "barbarians" into "Hwa":

In the Ten Articles for Instruction, the King Taejo of Goryeo expressed his wish for the Goryeo dynasty to follow the example of the Emperor Yao and highlighted the influence of the Tang dynasty on Korea:

The King Injong of Goryeo once issued an edict that urged the Koreans to discard the ways of the Khitan "barbarians" in favor of Chinese traditions:

The Veritable Records of the Joseon Dynasty labelled Korea as "Sojunghwa" and highlighted the relations between China and Korea:

The court-commissioned Comprehensive Mirror of the Eastern State by Seo Geo-jeong highlighted the Chinese influence on Korea:

In the 17th century, when the Manchu-led Qing dynasty replaced the Han-led Ming dynasty as the ruling dynasty of China proper, the Joseon dynasty believed that the Qing dynasty was unworthy of succeeding the politico-cultural orthodoxy of "China". Instead, the Confucianist Joseon dynasty asserted itself as the legitimate heir to the Chinese civilization and termed itself "Little China". In 2010, scholar Brian Reynolds Myers stated in reference to the move that:

Sojunghwa is closely related to the classical sadaejuui.

Vietnam 
Numerous Vietnamese dynasties attempted to replicate the Chinese tributary system in Southeast Asia, whilst maintaining tributary relations with Chinese dynasties. Vietnamese monarchs of multiple dynasties adopted the imperial title "hoàng đế" ("emperor") domestically, but reverted to the royal title "vương" ("king") when dealing with China—a policy known as "emperor at home, king abroad". On many occasions, Vietnamese dynasties styled themselves as "China" and referred to various Chinese dynasties as "Bắc Triều" ("northern dynasty") in relation to Vietnam, self-styled as "Nam Triều" ("southern dynasty"). Although this ideology is not as affirmed in post-dynasty eras, a shadow of this legacy exists today in the form of how places and names from the "North dynasty" were rendered in Vietnamese e.g. Qing Dynasty in Vietnamese was Nhà Thanh or Triều Thanh, names such as Lee Kuan Yew were transliterated as Lý Quang Diệu in Vietnamese. Likewise, whilst Vietnam had a "North" and "South" dichotomy with China, Korea's Little China ideology meant that names like Lee Kuan Yew were rendered "리콴유" in Hangul instead.  

In 1010, Lý Thái Tổ issued the Edict on the Transfer of the Capital that likened himself to Chinese monarchs who initiated the relocation of the capital, effectively positioning the Lý dynasty within the politico-cultural realm of China:

The Complete Annals of Đại Việt used "Trung Quốc" to refer to Vietnam:

Lê Thái Tổ once issued an edict that adopted "Trung Quốc" as an alternative name for Vietnam:

In 1470, in preparation for his invasion of Champa, Lê Thánh Tông issued an edict which referred to the Later Lê dynasty and earlier Vietnamese regimes as "Trung Quốc":

In 1479, Lê Thánh Tông issued an edict to justify his invasion of Muang Phuan. In the edict, "Trung Hạ" was used to refer to the Later Lê dynasty:

The Nguyễn dynasty considered itself the legitimate heir to the Chinese civilization. Gia Long Đế once used "Trung Quốc" and "Hạ" to refer to the Nguyễn and earlier Vietnamese dynasties:

The Imperially-commissioned Annotated Text Reflecting the Complete History of Việt referred to the Nguyễn dynasty as "Thần Châu":

In the Poems on the Way to Min, Lý Văn Phức (a descendent of Ming Chinese refugees) escorted some stranded Chinese sailors back to Fujian province. However, when he arrived there, the guesthouse where he was supposed to stay had a sign over it which indicated that it was for “barbarians.”  Lý Văn Phức defended his position with an essay that highlighted that Vietnam followed the ways of China without the Manchurian influences of the 17th century and therefore should be considered "Hoa":

Japan 
Fujiwara no Hirotsugu once presented a memorial to the throne, referring to Japan as "Chūgoku" and adopted the Chinese worldview of treating surrounding ethnic minorities as "barbarians":

The Chronicles of Japan used "Chūgoku" to refer to Japan:

The Extended Chronicles of Japan referred to Japan as "Chūgoku":

When the Empress Genmei yielded the throne to the Empress Genshō, Japan was referred to as "Kaka" in an edict issued by the former:

After the Qing dynasty had replaced the Ming dynasty in China proper, Japanese scholars declared that the Qing dynasty did not have the legitimacy to represent the politico-cultural realm of "China" whilst simultaneously explicitly identifying Japan as "China". In Kai Hentai by Hayashi Gahō and Hayashi Hōkō, it was argued that Japan had replaced the Qing dynasty as the center of Chinese civilization. In Chūchō Jijitsu by Yamaga Sokō, "Chūchō" (used in a similar sense as "Middle Kingdom"), "Chūka" and "Chūgoku" were adopted as alternative names for Japan, while "Gaichō" ("outer dynasty") was used to refer to the Qing dynasty.

During the Meiji Restoration, the Emperor Meiji once issued an edict that referred to Japan as "Ka":

See also 
 Chinese influence on Japanese culture
 Vietnam under Chinese rule
 Pax Sinica
 Sadaejuui

Notes

References 

Confucianism in Japan
Confucianism in Vietnam
Culture in Joseon
East Asian culture
Edo period
Foreign relations of China
Japanese nationalism
Japanese philosophy
Korean Confucianism
Korean nationalism
Korean philosophy
Nguyen dynasty

Vietnamese nationalism
Vietnamese philosophy